Syed Aziz (born 7 October 1998) is a Malaysian cricketer. He played for Malaysia in the 2017 ICC World Cricket League Division Three tournament in May 2017. In April 2018, he was named in Malaysia's squad for the 2018 ICC World Cricket League Division Four tournament, also in Malaysia.

In August 2018, he was named in Malaysia's squad for the 2018 Asia Cup Qualifier tournament. In October 2018, he was named in Malaysia's squad in the Eastern sub-region group for the 2018–19 ICC World Twenty20 Asia Qualifier tournament.

In December 2018, he was one of two Malaysian cricketers signed to play a four-month stint of first-class cricket in Sri Lanka. He made his first-class debut for Sri Lanka Police Sports Club in Tier B of the 2018–19 Premier League Tournament on 11 February 2019.

In June 2019, he was named in Malaysia's squad for the 2019 Malaysia Tri-Nation Series tournament. He made his Twenty20 International (T20I) debut for Malayasia, against Thailand, on 24 June 2019. In September 2019, he was named in Malaysia's squad for the 2019 Malaysia Cricket World Cup Challenge League A tournament. He made his List A debut for Malaysia, against Denmark, in the Cricket World Cup Challenge League A tournament on 16 September 2019.

In July 2022, he was named in Malaysia's squad for the 2022 Canada Cricket World Cup Challenge League A tournament. On 28 July 2022, in Malaysia's match against Vanuatu, he took his first five-wicket haul in List A cricket.

References

External links
 

1998 births
Living people
Malaysian cricketers
Malaysia Twenty20 International cricketers
Sri Lanka Police Sports Club cricketers
Place of birth missing (living people)
Southeast Asian Games silver medalists for Malaysia
Southeast Asian Games medalists in cricket
Competitors at the 2017 Southeast Asian Games